Amélie Mauresmo was the two-time defending champion, and successfully defended her title.

Seeds

Draw

Finals

Top half

Bottom half

References

2005 Women's Singles
Advanta Championships - Singles
Sports in Philadelphia
Tennis in Pennsylvania